Trisomic rescue (also known as trisomy rescue or trisomy zygote rescue) is a genetic phenomenon in which a fertilized ovum containing three copies of a chromosome loses one of these chromosomes (anaphase lag) to form a diploid chromosome complement. If both of the retained chromosomes come from the same parent, then uniparental disomy results. The mechanism of trisomic rescue has been well confirmed in vivo, and alternative mechanisms that occur in trisomies are rare in comparison.

References

External links
 Resources - Genetics Home Reference

Cytogenetics